Pide may refer to:
 Pita, a flatbread common in the Middle Eastern cuisine
 PIDE ("Polícia Internacional e de Defesa do Estado or PIDE" – International and State Defense Police; later renamed "Direcção-Geral de Segurança" – General Security Directorate), the political secret police during the authoritarian Portuguese regime of the Estado Novo
 Pakistan Institute of Development Economics, a post-graduate research institute and public policy think tank in Pakistan